Edwin George Sperber (January 21, 1895 – January 5, 1976) was an American professional baseball outfielder. He played in Major League Baseball (MLB) for two seasons for the Boston Braves.

External links

 

1895 births
1976 deaths
Major League Baseball outfielders
Boston Braves players
Baseball players from Cincinnati